In mathematics, particularly in computer algebra, Abramov's algorithm computes all rational solutions of a linear recurrence equation with polynomial coefficients. The algorithm was published by Sergei A. Abramov in 1989.

Universal denominator 
The main concept in Abramov's algorithm is a universal denominator. Let  be a field of characteristic zero. The dispersion  of two polynomials  is defined aswhere  denotes the set of non-negative integers. Therefore the dispersion is the maximum  such that the polynomial  and the -times shifted polynomial  have a common factor. It is  if such a  does not exist. The dispersion can be computed as the largest non-negative integer root of the resultant . Let  be a recurrence equation of order  with polynomial coefficients , polynomial right-hand side  and rational sequence solution  . It is possible to write  for two relatively prime polynomials . Let  andwhere  denotes the falling factorial of a function. Then  divides . So the polynomial  can be used as a denominator for all rational solutions  and hence it is called a universal denominator.

Algorithm 

Let again  be a recurrence equation with polynomial coefficients and  a universal denominator. After substituting  for an unknown polynomial  and setting  the recurrence equation is equivalent toAs the  cancel this is a linear recurrence equation with polynomial coefficients which can be solved for an unknown polynomial solution . There are algorithms to find polynomial solutions. The solutions for  can then be used again to compute the rational solutions .  

 algorithm rational_solutions is
     input: Linear recurrence equation .
     output: The general rational solution  if there are any solutions, otherwise false.
 
     
     
     
     Solve  for general polynomial solution 
     if solution  exists then
         return general solution 
     else
         return false
     end if

Example 

The homogeneous recurrence equation of order over  has a rational solution. Using  the general rational solution isfor arbitrary .

References 

Computer algebra